William Henry Askwith (17 September 1843 - 9 April 1911) was Archdeacon of Taunton from 1903  until his death.

Askwith was educated at Cheltenham College and Trinity College, Cambridge. He was ordained in 1867 and began his career with curacies at Tidcombe then New Radford. He was Vicar of Christ Church, Derby from 1876 to 1887; then Vicar of St Mary Magdalene, Taunton, for the rest of his life.

Notes

1843 births
1911 deaths
People educated at Cheltenham College
Alumni of Trinity College, Cambridge
Archdeacons of Taunton